Viriconium Nights is a collection by M. John Harrison published in 1984.

Plot summary
Viriconium Nights is a collection of seven stories set in and around the metropolis of Viriconium.

Reception
Dave Langford reviewed Viriconium Nights for White Dwarf #70, and stated that "They have a precise, exotic sleaziness, leaving you with uncomfortable images: insect-masks recur, and the Mari Llwyd (the rib-boned horse-skull of folklore), and technological decay (as with the unforgettable, filthy power-weapon of the first story). I like them. I think."

Reviews
Review by Brian Stableford (1985) in Fantasy Review, February 1985
Review by Baird Searles (1985) in Isaac Asimov's Science Fiction Magazine, February 1985
Review by Barbara Davies (1985) in Vector 128

References

1984 short stories
British short story collections